Teribus ye teri odin or teribus an teriodin is popularly believed to have been the war cry of the men of Hawick at the Battle of Flodden, and has been preserved in the traditions of the town. In 1819, James Hogg wrote a border ballad with the same name.

Etymology
The origins of the term are unknown. Attempts have been made to connect the phrase teribus an teriodin with the names of the Scandinavian and Norse gods, Tyr and Odin from the Old English Tȳr hæbbe ūs, ġe Tȳr ġe Ōðinn "Tyr keep us, both Tyr and Odin", an unlikely explanation since the gods' names are given in their Old Norse forms, not the Old English Tīw and Wōden and the normal phonological development would not result in the modern pronunciation, apart from that, the survival of a supposed Old English sentence in its near original form for more than 700 years is barely conceivable.

Charles Mackay described the ballad, of which these mysterious words form the burden, is one of patriotic "defence and defiance" against foreign invaders and suggested that the phrase is a corruption, or phonetic rendering, of the Scottish Gaelic "Tìr a buaidh, 's tìr a dìon" meaning "Land of victory and land of defence".

The linguist Anatoly Liberman states, however, that Mackay's goal was to discover the Gaelic origin of all words and that he thought that most English words are traceable to Gaelic, which is certainly not true. Liberman also described MacKay's 1877 dictionary as "full of the most fanciful conjectures", noting that MacKay "was hauled over the coals by his contemporaries and never taken seriously".

Suggestions
It has also been suggested that the phrase is a series of vocables imitating the sound of a march played on drums and bagpipes.

Alistair Moffat suggests in Arthur and the Lost Kingdoms (1999) that the phrase was originally the Welsh "Tir y Bas y Tir y Odin," meaning "The Land of Death, the Land of Odin", although Odin wasn't noted for his popularity amongst the Welsh. However, he also postulates that the phrase could mean "Land of Death, Land of the Gododdin" (The initial G is often elided), the Gododdin being the local Britonnic tribe of the area.

References to the "war cry" teribus an teriodin do not appear much before the early 19th century.

Border ballad
The Border ballad Teribus ye teri odin is sung at festive gatherings, not only in the gallant old border town itself. In the past it was sung in the remotest districts of Canada, the United States and Australia, wherever Hawick men ("Teris"), and natives of the Scottish Border congregated to keep up the remembrance of their native land, and haunts of their boyhood.

The full version of the Border ballad written by James Hogg in 1819 (not James Hogg, "The Ettrick Shepherd", with the same name), which replaced an earlier one by Arthur Balbirnie used a generation earlier, is still sung at the Hawick Common Riding in June of every year.

The ballad begins as follows;

"Teribus ye teri odin
Sons of heroes slain at Flodden
Imitating Border bowmen
Aye defend your rights and common"

See also
 Flowers of the Forest

References

Sources
 MacKay, Charles – A Dictionary of Lowland Scotch (1888)
 Moffat, Alistair – Arthur and the Lost Kingdoms (Weidenfeld & Nicolson, 1999)
  A Hawick Wordbook - Douglas Scott

Hawick
Scottish folklore
Scottish words and phrases
Mottos